Alucita cymatodactyla is a moth of the family Alucitidae. It is found in France, Spain, Italy, Slovenia, Hungary, Croatia, Bosnia and Herzegovina, Albania, Bulgaria, the Republic of Macedonia and Iran, Israel, Lebanon and Turkey. The habitat consists of dry and semi-dry closed grasslands and riverine ash-alder woodlands.

Adults emerge in September, hibernate, then are again found in spring, from April to early July.

References

Moths described in 1852
Alucitidae
Moths of Europe
Moths of Asia
Taxa named by Philipp Christoph Zeller
Moths of the Middle East